Boston Town Football Club is a football club based in Boston, Lincolnshire, England.

History
The club was established as Boston Football Club in 1963 by former officials of Boston United who were concerned that United's financial problems which had led it to resign from the Midland League would force it to fold. It joined the Lincolnshire League, winning it in its first season. It moved to the Central Alliance the following season, going on to win a second successive league title without losing a match. In 1966 it joined the Eastern Counties League. After finishing sixth in its first season, the club finished second from bottom in 1967–68, forcing it to seek re-election. However, as the club was on the northern edge of the league's geographical boundary, it resigned and instead joined the Midland League.

Boston won the Midland League in 1974–75; having finished its league fixtures it was ahead of Eastwood Town in the table but Eastwood had one match left at Skegness and could overtake Boston if it won. Despite being 3–1 up at half time, they eventually drew 3–3, meaning Boston was the league champion team. In  1976–77 the club reached the first round of the FA Cup for the first time, losing 3–1 at Barnsley. It won the league again in 1978–79; in a repeat of the 1974–75 title, Boston had finished its fixtures at the top of the table, but Skegness could overtake if it won its final fixture. However, Skegness lost at Retford Town.

Boston won its third Midland League title in 1980–81, and in 1982 became a member of the Northern Counties East Football League when the Midland League merged with the Yorkshire League. The club was placed in the Premier Division of the new league, but after finishing bottom in 1986–87 it dropped into the Supreme Division of the Central Midlands League. It won the Central Midlands League in 1988–89, and, despite only finishing ninth in 1990–91, was accepted into the Premier Division of the United Counties League. In 1993–94 the club reached the semi-finals of the FA Vase, but lost 2–0 on aggregate to Taunton Town. In 1994 Boston were renamed Boston Town and won the league in its first season under the new name. It won the United Counties League for a second time in 2000–01 and went on to win the League Cup in 2003–04 and again in 2006–07. In 2008–09 Boston won the Lincolnshire Senior Trophy, beating Winterton Rangers in the final.

Ground
The club initially played at the Mayflower Sports Ground for a few months, before moving to its current Tattershall Road ground. The ground has a wooden stand on one side of the pitch, which is divided into three sections, one of which has seats. Another stand with bench seating is located behind one goal, with a covered area behind the other goal adjacent to the clubhouse, turnstiles and tea bar. The ground currently has a capacity of 6,000, of which 450 is seated and 950 covered.

Honours
United Counties League
Premier Division champions 1994–95, 2000–01
League Cup winners 2003–04, 2006–07
Central Midlands League
Supreme Division champions 1988–89
Midland League
Champions 1974–75, 1978–79, 1980–81
League Cup winners 1976–77
Central Alliance
Champions 1965–66
Lincolnshire League
Champions 1964–65
Lincolnshire Senior Trophy
Winners 1973–74, 1979–80, 1980–81, 1981–82, 1988–89, 1989–90, 2008–09
Lincolnshire Senior B Cup
Winners 1965–66

Records
Best FA Cup performance: First round, 1976–77
Best FA Trophy performance: Second round, 1979–80
Best FA Vase performance: Semi-finals, 1993–94
Record attendance: 2,700 vs Boston United, FA Cup third qualifying round, 1970
Biggest victory: 12–1 vs Clay Cross Works, 1965–66
Most appearances: Lee Rippin
Most goals: Gary Bull, 201, 2005–12
Most goals in a season: Gary Bull, 57, 2006–07

See also
Boston Town F.C. players
Boston Town F.C. managers

References

External links
Official website

 
Football clubs in England
Football clubs in Lincolnshire
Association football clubs established in 1964
1964 establishments in England
Sport in Boston, Lincolnshire
Lincolnshire Football League
Central Alliance
Eastern Counties Football League
Midland Football League (1889)
Northern Counties East Football League
Central Midlands Football League
United Counties League